Eli Josef King (born 23 December 2002) is a Welsh footballer who plays for Cardiff City, as a midfielder.

Club career
He made his first-team debut on 23 October 2021 as a second half substitute in the 2–0 Championship defeat against Middlesbrough.

He moved on loan to Crewe Alexandra in August 2022, making his Crewe debut in a goalless draw at Bradford City on 27 August 2022. He returned to Cardiff in January 2023.

International career
After playing for Wales under-17s, King was selected for the Wales under-21 squad in November 2021. He was called up again in September 2022 for the Wales under-21s' friendly with Austria.

Career statistics

References

2002 births
Living people
Welsh footballers
Wales youth international footballers
Cardiff City F.C. players
Crewe Alexandra F.C. players
English Football League players
Association football midfielders
Wales under-21 international footballers